The Knoxville Indians were a Minor League Baseball team that played in the Southeastern League in 1897. They were located in Knoxville, Tennessee, and played their home games at Baldwin Park. The Indians were the first professional baseball team to hail from Knoxville.

They played their first game on April 19, losing to the Atlanta Crackers, 3–2. Knoxville won the next afternoon's game, shutting out Atlanta, 4–0. The league disbanded on May 29 due to poor patronage across the circuit. Knoxville played its final game on May 28, defeating the Asheville Moonshiners, 8–2. At the time of the disbandment, Knoxville held a 22–10 (.688) first-place record, making them the de facto pennant winners.

Knoxville did not field another club until the Knoxville Tennessee–Alabama League team began play in 1904.

Notable players

Three Indians also played in at least one game in Major League Baseball during their careers. These players were:

Davey Crockett
Wiley Davis
Jim Jones

References

External links 
Statistics from Baseball-Reference
Statistics from Stats Crew

1897 establishments in Tennessee
1897 disestablishments in Tennessee
Baseball teams established in 1897
Baseball teams disestablished in 1897
Defunct baseball teams in Tennessee
Professional baseball teams in Tennessee
Southeastern League (1897) teams
Sports in Knoxville, Tennessee